David Henry Patton (November 26, 1837 – January 17, 1914) was an American physician, Civil War veteran who served one term as a U.S. Representative from Indiana from 1891 to 1893.

Biography 
Born in Flemingsburg, Kentucky, Patton attended the Collegiate Institute, Waveland, Indiana.
Enlisted in the Thirty-eighth Indiana Regiment in 1861 and was mustered out in July 1865, after having attained the rank of colonel.
He graduated from the Chicago Medical College in 1867 and practiced medicine in Remington, Indiana.
Pension examiner at Remington 1886-1890.
He served as delegate to the Democratic National Convention in 1892 and 1900.

Congress 
Patton was elected as a Democrat to the Fifty-second Congress (March 4, 1891 – March 3, 1893).
He was not a candidate for renomination in 1892.

Later career and death 
He moved to Woodward, Woodward County, Indian Territory (now Oklahoma), in 1893.
He was appointed receiver of public lands for Oklahoma in 1893, and later resumed the practice of medicine.
He served as member of the district board of health of Woodward, Oklahoma.
He was appointed pension examiner at Woodward.

He died in Otterbein, Indiana, on January 17, 1914.
He was interred in Remington Cemetery, Remington, Indiana.

References

1837 births
1914 deaths
People from Flemingsburg, Kentucky
People of Indiana in the American Civil War
People from Remington, Indiana
Feinberg School of Medicine alumni
Union Army colonels
Democratic Party members of the United States House of Representatives from Indiana
19th-century American politicians